Océade was an indoor waterpark in the northwest of Brussels, Belgium and the largest of its kind in the Brussels Capital Region.

The park
Established by Océade France as part of 3 park franchise, with the other 2 parks located in France, it was the only park remaining in business after the French parks closed. Running at a loss, the park was acquired by the Walibi Group in 1992, with management experience built up through Aqualibi near Wavre just south of Brussels.

The park was continuously expanded and renovated. It consisted of 14 water slides. These slides included the Hurricane, record holder for the fastest European slide (average speed 40 km/h), the Barracuda, the longest duo slide in Belgium, and the Anaconda, a slide with a width of 2,1 meters. De Cameleon was an interactive slide whereby people could customise the colour themselves. The park kept a constant temperature of 29 °C. With over 240,000 visitors per year and a combined volume of 1,800 m³ of water, Océade was a major leisure attraction in the Brussels Capital Region.

Closure
In 2016, the Brussels city council announced Océade would be forced to close to make space for its NEO project, a redevelopment project envisioning the replacement of most of Bruparck (including Kinepolis and Océade) on the Heysel Plateau with a shopping district and residential area. Under public protest, closure was repeatedly postponed until the definitive closing date of 30 September 2018. All water slides were purchased at a public auction by a Romanian company at a cost of €152,000, and the remaining pumps, saunas, kitchen equipment and furniture were sold for another €100,000. It was planned to reconstruct Océade in Romania, presumably near Bucharest.

See also
 List of water parks in Europe

References

Water parks